Chulpanovo may refer to:
Chulpanovo, Arsky District, Republic of Tatarstan, a village (selo) in Arsky District of the Republic of Tatarstan, Russia
Chulpanovo, Nurlatsky District, Republic of Tatarstan, a village (selo) in Nurlatsky District of the Republic of Tatarstan, Russia